United Nations Security Council resolution 1160, adopted on 31 March 1998, after noting the situation in Kosovo, the council, acting under Chapter VII of the United Nations Charter, imposed an arms embargo and economic sanctions on the Federal Republic of Yugoslavia, hoping to end the use of excessive force by the government.

Some countries had suggested a comprehensive arms embargo to be imposed against Serbia and Montenegro, including Kosovo. The Security Council condemned the violence that the Serbian police used against peaceful demonstrators, and the terrorist acts of the Kosovo Liberation Army.

Yugoslavia was urged to seek a political solution to the conflict, while the Kosovar Albanians were called upon to condemn all terrorist actions and pursue their goals through peaceful means. It was stated that the only way to avoid further violence was to allow the Kosovar Albanian community a genuine political process and prospects for meaningful autonomy and self-determination.

Acting under Chapter VII, the Council imposed an arms embargo on Serbia and Montenegro, and established a Committee to monitor its implementation and suggest improvements. The measures would be revised if it noted in reports from the Secretary-General Kofi Annan, the Organization for Security and Co-operation in Europe, Contact Group and European Union that Serbia and Montenegro had begun a dialogue, withdrew its police forces, allowed access to humanitarian aid agencies and accepted missions from the OSCE and United Nations High Commissioner for Refugees to the region.

The resolution concluded by asking the Prosecutor at the International Criminal Tribunal for the former Yugoslavia to begin gathering information on human rights violations, affirming that further measures would be imposed if there was no constructive progress. The arms embargo was lifted under Resolution 1367 (2001).

Resolution 1160 was approved by 14 votes to none against, with one abstention from China, which argued that it was an internal matter.

Consequences
The Kosovo Verification Mission sought to verify compliance with resolution 1160. The resolution was disregarded:

NATO then planned to intervene by force.

See also
 Breakup of Yugoslavia
 Kosovo War
 List of United Nations Security Council Resolutions 1101 to 1200 (1997–1998)

References

External links
 
Text of the Resolution at undocs.org

 1160
 1160
1998 in Yugoslavia
 1160
United Nations Security Council sanctions regimes
Sanctions against Yugoslavia
1998 in Kosovo
1998 in Serbia
March 1998 events
 1160